William Thomas House, also known as Wren's Nest and the Thomas Homestead, is a historic home located at Bellefonte, Centre County, Pennsylvania.  It consists of two sections: an "L"-shaped stone house built about 1785, and a two-story, five bay rectangular limestone house in the Georgian style architecture.  The latter was built in 1834.

It was added to the National Register of Historic Places in 1976.

References

External links
Thomas Homestead and the Wren's Nest: Virtual Walking Tour of Bellefonte, Pennsylvania, Bellefonte Historical and Cultural Association website

Houses on the National Register of Historic Places in Pennsylvania
Georgian architecture in Pennsylvania
Houses completed in 1834
Houses in Centre County, Pennsylvania
National Register of Historic Places in Centre County, Pennsylvania